The following is a list of awards and nominations received by Sasha, a Welsh DJ and record producer.

DJ Awards
The DJ Awards organises the annual electronic music DJ awards event it is the only international ceremony for DJs and also the oldest, the awards are held once a year at Pacha club in Ibiza Spain it is one of the most important accolades an artist can win or be honoured by.

Sasha has won the Best Progressive House DJ Award 3 times, Best Tech House/Progressive DJ Award1 time and received 11 nominations overall.

DJ Magazine Awards
Artists are nominated to the DJ Magazine Top 100 DJ's list each year the public votes to decide who they rank as the World's No 1 DJ at the end of the poll.

Sasha achieved the World's No 1 ranking DJ in 2000 and he stayed in the top 5 for 8 consecutive years, the top 10 for 11 consecutive years.

Electronic Music Awards
Sasha has won one award at the Electronic Music Awards.

Grammy Awards
In 2005, the Grammy committee debated whether Sasha's mix compilation album, Involver, was eligible for nomination as Best Electronic/Dance Album. The Recording Academy decided that the album was eligible, but Involver did not receive a nomination. Sasha did receive a Grammy nomination for his remix of Felix da Housecat's "Watching Cars Go By", which was featured on Involver.

International Dance Music Awards
At the annual Winter Music Conference, Sasha has won the "Best Techno/Trance 12" award (1999) for the Xpander EP, and "Best CD Compilation" awards for Global Underground: Ibiza (1999, 2000) and Involver (2004).  He was also nominated in the categories "Best European DJ" (2004) and "Best Remixer".

Sasha has achieved 4 wins from 10 nominations overall.

Muzik Awards
At the 1999 Ericsson Muzik Awards, he received an award for "Outstanding Contributions to Dance Music".

References

Lists of awards received by British musician